Desire is an album by jazz musician Tom Scott, recorded live to two tracks on June 30 and July 1, 1982 in Hollywood.

Reception
Billboard magazine called it "predictably broad-based fusion, with nods to contemporary black, pop and rock instrumental styles."

Track listing
All tracks composed by Tom Scott; except where indicated
"Desire" - 4:14
"Sure Enough" (Scott, Steve George, John Lang, Richard Page) - 4:25
"The Only One" - 5:16
"Stride" (Victor Feldman) - 5:33
"Johnny B. Badd" - 3:51
"Meet Somebody" (Ron Panvini, Leata Galloway) - 4:08
"Maybe I'm Amazed" (Paul McCartney) - 4:21
"Chunk O' Funk" - 5:11

Personnel
Tom Scott - synthesizer, alto, tenor and soprano saxophone
Pete Christlieb - clarinet, saxophone
Victor Feldman - organ, electric piano, Fender Rhodes, Oberheim
Bill Reichenbach Jr. - trombone
Michael Boddicker - synthesizer
Alex Brown - backing vocals
Vinnie Colaiuta - drums
Howard "Buzz" Feiten - electric guitar
Chuck Findley - trumpet, flugelhorn
Michael Fisher - percussion
Steve George - backing vocals
Carmen Grillo - backing vocals
Jerry Hey - trumpet, flugelhorn
Jim Horn - flute, saxophone
Michael Landau - acoustic and electric guitar
Richard Page - backing vocals
Stephanie Spruill - backing vocals
Neil Stubenhaus - bass
Maxine Willard Waters - backing vocals
Ernie Watts - flute, saxophone
Dick Hyde - trombone
Julia Waters - backing vocals
Carmen Twilley - backing vocals

Production 

 Recorded at: Ocean Way Studios (Hollywood, California)
 Recorded By: Allen Sides
 Live Sound Engineer and Tour Management: Garry Fish

References

Tom Scott (saxophonist) albums
1982 albums
Elektra/Musician albums